Samuel Arthur Campbell (August 1, 1895April 13, 1962) was an American nature writer, sometimes known as the "Philosopher of the Forest". He wrote for children and adults, and lectured widely.

Life 
Campbell was born on August 1, 1895, in Watseka, Illinois, the youngest of two children of Arthur J. and Katherine "Kittie" (née Lyman) Campbell. He married Virginia ("Giny") Adams on June 10, 1941. Among his friends was environmentalist Sigurd F. Olson. Campbell contributed an article to the inaugural issue of Olson's magazine North Country in spring 1951.

Campbell died April 13, 1962, in Barrington, Illinois. A trail near his home in Three Lakes, located in the Chequamegon–Nicolet National Forest, is named after him.

Writing and lectures 
Campbell was a writer, lecturer, photographer, and filmmaker.

From 1934 to 1958, he lectured on behalf of the Chicago and North Western Railway, which sought to promote its lines as a means for vacationers to visit attractions in northern Wisconsin and the Upper Peninsula of Michigan.

He studied wild animals from his home in Three Lakes, Wisconsin, which he called the "sanctuary of Wegimind"—reportedly after an Ojibwe word for "mother"—and during his various travels. He had visited the Three Lakes area from boyhood.

Works

For children 
  Illustrated by Bob Kuhn. Translated into French, as Bob et mes bêtes, 1956.
 
 
 
 
 
  Translated into French, as Le Lac aux sept secrets, 1953.

For adults 
 
  
 
 
  Illustrated by Harry Moeller.

References

Sources

External links
Documentary about Campbell
Campbell's films and publications

1895 births
1962 deaths
American children's writers
American nature writers
American male non-fiction writers
People from Watseka, Illinois